Thomas Alexander Ogilvie (7 January 1887 – 18 August 1915) was an Australian rules footballer who played for the University Football Club and Melbourne Football Club in the Victorian Football League (VFL).

Family
Alick Ogilvie was born in Williamstown in 1887, the youngest child of Captain John Ogilvie and Elizabeth Ogilvie, née Henderson. He was the younger brother of Melbourne player Laurie Ogilvie. He married Sarah Annie "Sadie" Fenandez (1887-1937). They had one child: Elizabeth (a.k.a. "Betty").

Education
He was educated at Scotch College, Melbourne, where he was captain of the first XVIII in 1904. He then enrolled to study law at the University of Melbourne in 1905, residing in Ormond College.

Football
During his first year of study he made single appearance for Melbourne against Geelong during the 1905 VFL season.

When University was admitted to the VFL for the 1908 season, he resumed his VFL football career, and played for University in its first VFL match (against Carlton). In all, he made 27 appearances and mostly playing as a forward. He was regarded as one of the team’s leading players and represented Victoria in the 1908 Melbourne Carnival.

Law
Having completed his degree, Ogilvie was conditionally admitted to practice law in November 1911. His admission was subsequently confirmed in November 1912. He commenced his legal practice with Mr W. M. Strong in Rutherglen and Corowa.

Military career
In September 1914, Ogilvie enlisted with the 12th Infantry Battalion in Morphettville, South Australia. He departed Melbourne on HMAT Geelong on 17 September 1914 and commenced training at Mena camp in Egypt in early 1915. Whilst in training, he faced a court martial proceeding on 23 February 1915 for not returning to camp on time from granted leave. He noted in his defence that he overstayed his leave by reason of falling asleep whilst in town. Ogilvie was sentenced to reduction to ranks.

The 12th battalion was mobilised and participated in the ANZAC landing at Gallipoli. Ogilvie quickly regained rank, being promoted again to corporal, then second lieutenant by 10 July 1915.

Death
In August the 12th Battalion contributed two companies to the attack on Lone Pine. It was here that Ogilvie sustained a severe gunshot wound to the right eye on 7 August 1915. Ogilvie’s condition was noted as dangerously ill and on 12 August 1915 he was shipped on the Hospital Transport Dunluce Castle to the Auberge de Baviere hospital in Valletta, Malta. Ogilvie died of his wounds on 18 August 1915, and was buried at Pieta Military Cemetery.

See also
 List of Victorian Football League players who died in active service
 1908 Melbourne Carnival

Footnotes

References
 Melbourne University Football Team, Victorian Football League, 1909: Ogilvie is second from the left in the back row
 First World War Nominal Roll: Second Lieutenant Thomas Alexander Ogilvie, Collection of the Australian War Memorial.
 First World War Embarkation Roll: Lance Sergeant Thomas Alexander Ogilvie (721), Collection of the Australian War Memorial.
 First World War Service Record: Second Lieutenant Thomas Alexander Ogilvie (721), National Archives of Australia.
 Our Heroes at the Front: Died of Wounds: Lieut. T.A. Ogilvie, The Rutherglen Sun and Chiltern Valley Advertiser, (Friday, 27 August 1915), p.3.
 The Roll of Honor: Seventy-Fourth Casualty List: South Australia: Died of Wounds, The (Adelaide) Advertiser, (Tuesday, 7 September 1915), p.9.
 Pieta Military Cemetery Malta: Grave of 2nd Lieutenant Thomas Alexander Ogilvie of the 12th Battalion AIF, who died on 1915-08-18, aged 28 years (Donor President of Malta), Collection of the Australian War Memorial.

External links

DemonWiki profile

1887 births
1915 deaths
Australian rules footballers from Melbourne
University Football Club players
Melbourne Football Club players
Australian military personnel killed in World War I
People educated at Scotch College, Melbourne
People from Williamstown, Victoria
Military personnel from Melbourne
20th-century Australian lawyers
Lawyers from Melbourne
University of Melbourne alumni
Australian people of Scottish descent
Burials at Pietà Military Cemetery